Gordon Wynnivo Jones (April 5, 1912 – June 20, 1963) was an American character actor, a member of John Wayne's informal acting company best known for playing Lou Costello's TV nemesis "Mike the Cop" and appearing as The Green Hornet in the first of two movie serials based on that old-time radio program.

Career

Iowa-born Jones had been a student athlete and star football guard ("Bull" Jones) at University of California, Los Angeles, and had also played a few seasons of professional football. He started out playing small roles in Wesley Ruggles' and Ernest B. Schoedsack's The Monkey's Paw (1933), his first credited role in Sam Wood's Let 'Em Have It (1935), and Sidney Lanfield's Red Salute (1935). By 1937, he had moved on to a contract at RKO Radio Pictures. In 1940, Jones had the title role in The Green Hornet but did not reprise the role in the sequel.  

Jones  held a reserve commission in the Army and was called into the service after filming his roles as "The Wreck" in My Sister Eileen (1942) and "Alabama Smith" in Flying Tigers (1942), a John Wayne vehicle that was one of the most popular action films of the war. This picture began Jones' 20-year onscreen association with Wayne, who was also a former football player at the University of Southern California.

Jones remained associated with the service after the war, encouraging college students to consider the Reserve Officers' Training Corps. After resuming his acting career in the late 1940s, Jones appeared in prominent roles in the John Wayne features Big Jim McLain (1952) and Island in the Sky (1953). 

By the end of the 1940s, Jones had aged into a beefier screen presence and into very physical character roles. He was no longer a leading man but he had developed a comic villain persona which meshed with the work of Bud Abbott and Lou Costello. Jones' association with the duo began in The Wistful Widow of Wagon Gap (1947) with the role of the film's heavy, Jake Frame, and continued through their television series The Abbott and Costello Show. Jones played "Mike the Cop", Costello's hulking, loud-voiced antagonist. The program was produced for only two seasons, but ensured continued recognition for Jones via frequent reruns and a 21st Century DVD release.

Jones also remained busy in films and on television throughout the 1950s, in pictures that ranged from the sci-fi chiller The Monster That Challenged the World to the Tony Curtis/Janet Leigh sex comedy The Perfect Furlough, and on TV series ranging from The Real McCoys to The Rifleman. In 1956 Jones appeared as C. R. Tatum in the western TV series Cheyenne on the episode titled "The Last Train West." Jones also appeared in two very successful Disney movies during the early '60s, The Absent-Minded Professor and Son of Flubber. He played harried school coaches in both pictures. He also starred with Mitzi Green and Virginia Gibson in the short-lived TV sitcom So This Is Hollywood (1955), and had a recurring role as neighbor Butch Barton during the early years of The Adventures of Ozzie and Harriet

Jones returned to the John Wayne stock company portraying Douglas, the bureaucrat antagonist to Wayne's G.W. McLintock in the Western comedy McLintock! (1963). Jones unexpectedly succumbed to a heart attack on June 12, 1963, five months before the release of that movie.

Jones has a star on the Hollywood Walk of Fame on the West side of the 1600 block of Vine Street.

Selected filmography

 Cimarron (1931) - Teamster (uncredited)
 Wild Girl (1932) - Vigilante (uncredited)
 The Monkey's Paw (1933) - Soldier (uncredited)
 Car 99 (1935) - Mechanic (uncredited)
 Let 'Em Have It (1935) - Tex
 Red Salute (1935) - Michael (Lefty) Jones
 Strike Me Pink (1936) - Butch Carson
 Captain Calamity (1936) - Henchman (uncredited)
 Devil's Squadron (1936) - Tex
 Walking on Air (1936) - Joe
 Don't Turn 'Em Loose (1936) - Joe Graves
 Night Waitress (1936) - Martin Rhodes
 We Who Are About to Die (1937) - Slim Tolliver
 They Wanted to Marry (1937) - Jim
 Sea Devils (1937) - Puggy
 China Passage (1937) - Joe Dugan
 There Goes My Girl (1937) - Reporter Dunn
 Forlorn River (1937) - Lem Watkins (uncredited)
 The Big Shot (1937) - Chester 'Chet' Scott
 Fight for Your Lady (1937) - Mike Scanlon
 Quick Money (1937) - Bill Adams
 Night Spot (1938) - Riley
 Rich Man, Poor Girl (1938) - Tom Grogan
 I Stand Accused (1938) - Blackie
 Out West with the Hardys (1938) - Ray Holt
 Long Shot (1939) - Jeff Clayton
 Pride of the Navy (1939) - Joe Falcon
 Big Town Czar (1939) - Chuck Hardy (uncredited)
 Invitation to Happiness (1939) - Dutch Arnold (uncredited)
 Grand Jury Secrets (1939) - Billy Hargraves (uncredited)
 When Tomorrow Comes (1939) - Radio Technician (uncredited)
 Disputed Passage (1939) - Bill Anderson
 Henry Goes Arizona (1939) - Tug Evans (uncredited)
 The Green Hornet (1940, Serial) - Britt Reid / The Green Hornet
 The Doctor Takes a Wife (1940) - O'Brien
 I Take This Oath (1940) - Steve Hanagan
 Up in the Air (1940) - Tex
 Girl from Havana (1940) - Tubby Waters
 Texas Rangers Ride Again (1940) - Ranger Radio Man (uncredited)
 Reaching for the Sun (1941) - Sailor (uncredited)
 The Blonde from Singapore (1941) - 'Waffles' Billings
 You Belong to Me (1941) - Robert Andrews
 The Feminine Touch (1941) - Rubber-Legs Ryan
 Among the Living (1941) - Bill Oakley
 True to the Army (1942) - Pvt. Dugan
 To the Shores of Tripoli (1942) - Military Policeman at Main Gate (uncredited)
 They All Kissed the Bride (1942) - Taxi Driver (uncredited)
 My Sister Eileen (1942) - 'The Wreck' Loomis
 Highways by Night (1942) - 'Footsy' Fogarty
 Flying Tigers (1942) - Alabama Smith
 Thirty Seconds Over Tokyo (1944)
 Buffalo Bill (1944) - Trooper (uncredited)
 Youth Runs Wild (1944) - Truck Driver (uncredited)
 Wanderer of the Wasteland (1945) - Sheriff (uncredited)
 The Secret Life of Walter Mitty (1947) - Tubby Wadsworth
 The Wistful Widow of Wagon Gap (1947) - Jake Frame
 A Foreign Affair (1948) - Military Policeman
 Sons of Adventure (1948) - Andy Baldwin
 Black Eagle (1948) - Benjy Laughton
 The Untamed Breed (1948) - Happy Keegan
 Take Me Out to the Ball Game (1949) - Senator Catcher (uncredited)
 Mr. Soft Touch (1949) - Muggles (uncredited)
 Easy Living (1949) - Bill Holloran
 Black Midnight (1949) - Roy
 Tokyo Joe (1949) - Idaho
 Dear Wife (1949) - Taxi Cab Driver
 Bodyhold (1949) - Pat Simmons
 Belle of Old Mexico (1950) - Tex Barnet
 The Palomino (1950) - Bill Hennessey
 The Arizona Cowboy (1950) - I.Q. Barton
 Trigger, Jr. (1950) - Splinters McGonagle
 Big Timber (1950) - Jocko
 Sunset in the West (1950) - Splinters McGonagle
 North of the Great Divide (1950) - Splinters McGonigle
 Trail of Robin Hood (1950) - Splinters McGonigle
 Spoilers of the Plains (1951) - Splinters McGonigle
 Heart of the Rockies (1951) - Splinters McGonigle
 Corky of Gasoline Alley (1951) - Elwood Martin
 Yellow Fin (1951) - Breck
 The Marrying Kind (1952) - Steve (uncredited)
 Gobs and Gals (1952) - CPO Mike Donovan
 Sound Off (1952) - Sgt. Crockett
 The Winning Team (1952) - George Glasheen
 Big Jim McLain (1952) - Olaf
 Wagon Team (1952) - Marshal Sam Taplin
 Woman They Almost Lynched (1953) - Yankee Sergeant
 Island in the Sky (1953) - Walrus
 Take the High Ground! (1953) - Moose (uncredited)
 The Outlaw Stallion (1954) - Wagner
 Treasure of Ruby Hills (1955) - Jack Voyle
 Smoke Signal (1955) - Cpl. Rogers
 Spring Reunion (1957) - Jack Frazer
 Shoot-Out at Medicine Bend (1957) - Pvt. Wilbur 'Will' Clegg
 The Monster That Challenged the World (1957) - Sheriff Josh Peters
 Live Fast, Die Young (1958) - Pop Winters
 The Perfect Furlough (1958) - 'Sylvia', MP #1
 The Shaggy Dog (1959) - Captain Scanlon, Police Chief
 Battle Flame (1959) - Sgt. McKelvey
 The Big Fisherman (1959) - Minor Role (uncredited)
 Battle of the Coral Sea (1959) - Torpedoman Bates
 The Rise and Fall of Legs Diamond (1960) - Sgt. Joe Cassidy
 Master of the World (1961) - Rutland Basketball Coach (uncredited)
 The Absent-Minded Professor (1961) - Rutland Coach (uncredited)
 Son of Flubber (1963) - Rutland Coach (uncredited)
 McLintock!'' (1963) - Matt Douglas (final film role)

References
Notes

External links

 
 
 

1912 births
1963 deaths
Male actors from Iowa
People from Hardin County, Iowa
20th-century American male actors
American male film actors
American male telenovela actors
RKO Pictures contract players
UCLA Bruins football players